Stanica  is a village in the administrative district of Gmina Przeworno, within Strzelin County, Lower Silesian Voivodeship, in south-western Poland. Prior to 1945 it was in Germany and the name of the village was then Haltauf and it belonged to the family von Gaffron.

References

Stanica